The Miss Bahamas 2010 pageant was held on May 6, 2010. This year only 18 candidates were competing for the national crown. The chosen winner will represent The Bahamas at the Miss Universe 2010 and Miss World 2010. The winner of best national costume, the costume will be use in Miss Universe 2010. The First Runner Up entered Miss Intercontinental and the Second Runner Up entered Miss Supranational. Braneka Bassett of East Grand Bahama emerged victorious at the end of the contest. Bassett was the first titleholder of the newly merged Miss Bahamas title. Prior to this edition Miss Bahamas World and Miss Bahamas Universe were separate contests but were merged when the Miss Bahamas Organization acquired the Miss Universe license after having the Miss World license for several years. This continue until 2013 when the Miss Bahamas Organization (MBO) restructured the pageant and separated them into two separate pageants. In the following two editions where the pageant was still merged, to winners were crowned, one for Miss Universe and the other for Miss World. MBO would keep them separate until after Miss Universe 2015 when they lost the Miss Universe license. Today they only have the license for Miss World.

Final Results

Special Awards
Miss Congeniality -  Janay Pyfrom (South Andros)
Beauty With a Purpose - Janay Pyfrom (South Andros)
Best Talent - Janay Pyfrom (South Andros)
Best Body - Braneka Bassett (East Grand Bahama)
Top Model - Kendra Beneby (Berry Islands)
Best National Costume - Lataj Henfield (North Andros)

Official Delegates

External links
Official Website

Miss Bahamas
Bahamas, The
2010 in the Bahamas